Lingampally may refer to places in India:
 Lingampally, Hyderabad, Telangana. Its pin code is 500019.
 Lingampally, Ranga Reddy, Telangana
 Lingampally, Karimnagar, Telangana